Santo Corazón is a village in San Matías Municipality in Ángel Sandoval Province, Santa Cruz Department, eastern Bolivia. The mission of Santo Corazón is one of the Jesuit Missions of the Chiquitos.

Santo Corazón has a population of 774 as of the 2012 census.

History
In 1760, the Jesuit Mission of Santo Corazón was founded by Jesuit missionaries Antonio Gaspar and José Chueca.

Languages
Today, Camba Spanish is the most commonly used everyday language. In the past, various dialects of Otuke, such as Coraveca (Curave, Ecorabe), were spoken at the mission of San José de Chiquitos.

See also
 List of Jesuit sites
 List of the Jesuit Missions of Chiquitos

References

Populated places in Santa Cruz Department (Bolivia)
Buildings and structures in Santa Cruz Department (Bolivia)
Tourist attractions in Santa Cruz Department (Bolivia)
Churches in Bolivia
Jesuit Missions of Chiquitos